Single Ladies is an American comedy-drama television series that debuted on May 30, 2011, as a two-hour television film on VH1. Created by Stacy A. Littlejohn and produced by Queen Latifah's Flavor Unit Entertainment, the series chronicles the lives of three friends—Val, Keisha and April (and later Raquel)—and their relationships. VH1 announced on February 28, 2014, that Single Ladies was canceled. It was announced on April 8, 2014, that BET Networks ordered a fourth season which would air on Centric. Single Ladies returned on March 18, 2015 with Melissa De Sousa joining the cast.

Cast

Main
 Stacey Dash as Valerie "Val" Stokes (season 1): An aspiring fashion mogul who purchased a fashion boutique in "one of the hottest areas of Atlanta," the VH1 website says, "Ultimately, she's a "good girl" looking for a good man." Val has relocated to Milan and sold her boutique over to Raquel.
 D. B. Woodside as Malcolm Franks (seasons 1–3): He turned his father's jewelry store into a successful international business. According to the VH1 blog, "He loves the ladies, and the ladies love him." In season 4, he has been missing without a trace.
 Charity Shea as April Goldberg-Jenkins: April has been married for seven years to Darryl, and hopes to pursue her career dream by moving from assistant to the record label's owner to an A&R executive. As she begins to spread her wings, she realizes that marriage may not be her ideal situation. April moved to London to pursue her career.
 LisaRaye McCoy as Keisha Green: a former hip-hop music video model turned semi-professional poker player who relies on her head instead of her heart when it comes to relationship decision-making. Keisha fled the country after being released from prison.
 Travis Winfrey as Omar Kearse (season 1, recurring; seasons 2–4): an employee at the boutique and the outspoken, openly gay friend to the women.
 Harold “House” Moore as Terrence Franks (seasons 1–2, recurring; season 3–4): Malcolm's troublesome brother.
 Terrell Tilford as Sean Clark (season 2, recurring; season 3): Keisha's ex-boyfriend and lawyer whom she begins dating on the rebound from Malcolm.
 Denise Vasi as Raquel Lancaster (seasons 2–3): a smart, savvy businesswoman. She has disappeared and is presumed to have been murdered in season 4.
 LeToya Luckett as Felicia Price (seasons 3–4): Savvy founder and Senior Partner of Price Management, one of the most influential music management companies in the world and April's new boss.
 Damien Dante Wayans as David Berenger (season 3, recurring; season 4) – April's one night stand who also works at Price Management.
 Chastity Dotson as Roshanda Rollins (season 4): Raquel's half-sister who arrives in Atlanta during Raquel's disappearance.
 Melissa De Sousa as Austin Aguilera (season 4): a socialite embarking on a business venture in Atlanta.

Recurring
 Timon Kyle Durrett as Quinn Davis (season 1) – Val's selfish basketball player boyfriend of five years.
 Tilky Jones as Casey (season 1) – Val's tattoo artist friend with benefits, hopes they can start a relationship.
 Anthony Azizi as Wes Domingus (season 1) – April's heartless boss at the record company.
 Tyler Hilton as Reed Durham (season 1) – A wild child singer that April takes under her wing when he struggles to get his album released.
 Queen Latifah as Sharon Love (season 1) – Val's college roommate and news presenter.
 Lauren London as Shelley (season 1) – Quinn's ex-fiancé and a friend to the girls, Jerry Waters' daughter.
 Rick Fox as Agent Winston (season 1) – an ambitious FBI agent investigating fraud and extortion who becomes involved with Keisha.
 Anthony Montgomery as Darryl Jenkins (seasons 1–2) – April's husband of seven years, an investment banker.
 Colin Salmon as Jerry Waters (seasons 1–2) – Owner of Quinn's basketball team, Shelley's father and Val's boyfriend.
 Flex Alexander as James Blackwell (season 2) – Shelley's boyfriend, running for governor of Atlanta.
 Tina Lifford as Evelyn Lancaster (season 2) – Raquel's snobbish mother.
 William Levy as Antonio (season 2) – Raquel's sex addicted childhood sweetheart.
 Paula Patton as Laila Twilight (season 2) – a singer feuding with Sharon Love.
 Ricky Whittle as Charles (season 2) – Raquel's boyfriend, a writer.
 Mark Tallman as Reggie Westfield (season 2) – April's problem prone boyfriend.
 Jamie Moreen as Nate Phillips (season 2) – a part-time boyfriend of Raquel's while she also dates Charles.
 Finesse Mitchell as Jobari Freeman (season 2) – a city bus driver that falls for Morgan until their different relationship plans clash.
 Cassandra Freeman as Morgan Thomas (seasons 2–4) – a crazy and wild new employee at the boutique, mother of one, also looking for love and a chance to expand her family.
 La La Anthony as Presley (seasons 2–4) – Omar's big sister.
 Lesley-Ann Brandt as Naomi Cox (season 3) – A woman that claims she and Malcolm's father were married and wants part ownership of Franks Jewels. She is represented by Sean Clark.
 Benzino as Dominic (season 3) – A poker player who has eyes for Keisha.
 Jason Giuliano as Nate Huntley (season 3) – Omar's potential love interest.
 Brian Ames as Ben Murphy (season 3)
 Alex Meraz as Sergio (season 3) – April's artist & ex-husband.
 Nicole Ari Parker as Dr. Evelyn Powell (season 4) – a pastor whose past may affect several lives.
 K. C. Collins as Derek (season 4) – Felicia's ex-husband.
 Michaela Thurlow as Tera Chey (season 4)
 Samantha Gracie as Breelyn Goldberg (season 4) – April's sister.
 Zoë Soul as Casey Bridges (season 4)
 Kathryn Winslow as Karen Bridges (season 4)
 Shailene Garnett as Bronwyn (season 4) – a newly hired temp working at Price Entertainment.

Guest stars

 Terrell Owens (season 1)
 Common as Mayor Trevor Howard (season 1) – the Mayor of Atlanta with a criminal history, has an affair with April and eight other women.
 Darrin DeWitt Henson as Blake (season 1); Detective Jordan (season 4)
 Wilson Cruz as Vincent (season 1)
 Kelly Rowland as DJ Denise Phillips (season 1) – a DJ that April persuades to play Reed's single, using her ties with April to sleep with Reed and get free clothes from the boutique.
 Pilar Sanders as Jennifer Howard (seasons 1–2) – Mayor Trevor Howard's wife.
 Rozonda 'Chilli' Thomas as herself — a personal friend of Keisha's.
 Kim Porter as Jasmine (season 1) – a conniving ex-video vixen that blackmails Keisha.
 Eve Jeffers as herself — an investor in the boutique.
 Jermaine Dupri as himself (season 1)
 Yelawolf as himself (season 1)
 Kandi Burruss (season 1)
 Cam'ron as himself  (season 1) — an old friend of Keisha's.
 Mac Miller as himself  (season 1) — an aspiring rapper that April manages to get signed.
 Michael Warren as Malcolm Franks, Sr. (season 1) – Malcolm's father.
 Durrell "Tank" Babbs as Joe Mason (season 2) – a charming aspiring boxer that squat's in one of Keisha's properties.
 Damien Leake as Dennis Lancaster (season 2) – Raquel's unfaithful father.
 Omar Gooding as Marcus (seasons 2–4) – the homophobic boyfriend of Omar's sister.
 Margaret Avery as Josephine (season 2) – a woman that befriends April at the ball.
 Victoria Rowell as Veronica Vanderbilt (season 2) – Raquel's lawyer and Sean's ex-girlfriend.
 Justin Gaston as Gavin (season 2) – a man that April dates for a short while.
 T.I. as Luke (season 2) – a friend of Keisha's and her pretender.
 Meek Mill as himself (season 3)
 Keke Palmer as herself (season 3)
 Wade Allain-Marcus as Wyatt (seasons 3–4)
 Future as himself (season 3)
 LaNeah "Starshell" Menzies as Gina Gamble (season 3) – an Assistant District Attorney who is being pursued by Sean to help build a criminal case against Malcolm Franks.
 Rico Ball as Grant (season 3) – a potential investor for Cut but is also interested in Raquel.
 Malik Yoba as Deacon Jarrett (season 3)
 Ja Rule as J.D. (season 3)
 Mateo as himself (season 3)
 Bobby Ray Simmons as himself (season 3–4)
 Karrueche Tran as Samantha Gray (season 4)
 Sharon Leal as Ellen Brown Barrington (season 4)

Episodes

Production
The show was tested as a movie before being turned into a 12-episode series. Executive director Olde reports that "TV, sometimes, under the best of circumstances, is a gut business," and went on to say that, after testing the script, the response was good enough for them to develop it into the series. Single Ladies is produced two episodes at a time to save money. Initially the program received reasonable ratings. The two-hour premiere gained a 1.2 rating in the 18–49 demographic with 2.8 million total viewers. It also scored a slightly higher 2.0 rating in the 18–34 female demographic. Latifah says she is "particularly proud" of the series, stating that "We wanted the ladies to be able to talk about mature things. (Sex and the City) was an inspiration, but the real inspiration was real life ... These are virile women who have emotions and desires, and they will be out there looking, but they'll do it on their own terms." Writer Littlejohn believes that Single Ladies could be a "jewel in the crown" for VH1." She also said that she feels like she is breaking new ground and setting a precedent, where VH1 and scripted shows are concerned, saying "I’m creating the formula". Stacey Dash decided to exit the series after its inaugural season. Dash commented, "I have to be back in L.A. with my children right now and the Single Ladies shooting location [in Atlanta] makes this impossible." She will be replaced by All My Children alumna Denise Vasi.

On August 22, 2012, VH1 renewed the series for a third season to premiere in late 2013. It was announced in September 2012, that Single Ladies''' creator and executive producer Stacy A. Littlejohn had chosen to leave after the second season. Littlejohn stated, "After two incredible seasons of Single Ladies, I have decided to entrust the show to the safe hands of VH1. Having fostered it from its inception, I’ve found great satisfaction in seeing these characters come to life on the screen, and am proud of what the show has become. But after two all-consuming seasons immersed in its production in the great city of Atlanta, I’ve decided it’s time to shift my focus to my life in Los Angeles and the creation of new projects." On May 20, 2013, the arrival of three new cast members was revealed: Letoya Luckett, Damien Wayans, Lesley-Ann Brandt were signed on as recurring cast members. ADR recording for the series was done at recording studio Cherry Beach Sound.

Tie-ins
To coincide with the third season, the series launched an e-book series. Written by New York Times author Ashley Antoinette, the e-book series helped to serve as an companion to the drama series picking up after the second-season finale.

 Single Ladies: April No Sex in the City: 1. Released November 26, 2013.
 Single Ladies: Raquel Trois: 2. Released December 3, 2013.
 Single Ladies: Keisha A Couple of Forevers: 3. Released December 10, 2013.
 Single Ladies: Three Stories (Bundle). Released December 17, 2013.

Reception
Critical reception of Single Ladies were not too favorable, Media Life Magazine reporter Tom Conroy reported that, "The female characters are either one-note (Keisha), inscrutable (April) or incoherent (Val). It’s unfair to blame the actresses. The writers are the ones who can’t decide if Val, for example, is the kind of girl who would make men wait 90 days or the kind of girl who would use a phrase like "tap this" referring to herself."

Ginia Bellafante of The New York Times reports that ""Single Ladies" has issues with black men, who are depicted as way too self-regarding, and blond women, who are simply taking up too much space on the planet. Not altogether predictably, the show reserves a certain kindness for that forgotten minority: the boyish white man. Apparently "Single Ladies" has yet to see "The Hangover Part II"." Hank Steuver of The Washington Post said that, "It's the TV equivalent of a beach read with no words. Even  if "Single Ladies" can be enjoyed in some basic brainless way (and even  though it's safely sequestered on VH1, where standards are aggressively  low), there's something steadfastly embarrassing about it."

Britni Danielle of clutchmagonline.com said "VH1 released the trailer for its new show, Single Ladies over the weekend and it looks promising!" and went on to say that "With shows like Basketball Wives, What Chili Wants, and Lets Talk About Pep, VH1 has been trying hard  to produce (reality) shows that appeal to Black women. Let’s hope this new one is worth our time."

David Hinckley of the NYDailyNews.com said "In any case, Single Ladies'' has stretches when it gets stuck in its own cliches and must fight its way through the soap suds." going on to add, "But it comes out the other side not looking half-bad. By the end of the first episode, it has created three distinct characters whose vulnerability and basic decency make us like them in spite of some obvious flaws." He went on to say, "There's a lot of soap, and the dialogue can make you wince. But the characters just might make you care."

References

External links

2010s American comedy-drama television series
2011 American television series debuts
2015 American television series endings
English-language television shows
Fashion-themed television series
Television shows set in Atlanta
VH1 original programming
American television series revived after cancellation